Snooker world rankings 1982/1983: The professional world rankings for the top 32 snooker players in the 1982–83 season are listed below. Players' performances in the previous three World Snooker Championships (1980, 1981 and 1982) contributed to their points total. For each of the three years, the World Champion gained five points, the runner-up received four, losing semi-finalists got three, losing quarter-finalists got two, and losers in the last-16 round received a single point. For players with no points, plaings were determined on the basis of their results at the 1983 World Championship.

Alex Higgins had two ranking points deducted for misconduct in February 1981, which meant that he was ranked second rather than first.

Notes

References

1982
Rankings 1983
Rankings 1982